The Desperate Hour (originally Lakewood) is a 2021 thriller film directed by Phillip Noyce. It stars Naomi Watts as a woman who is desperately racing to save her child after police place her hometown on lockdown due to an active shooter incident. The film was shot in the North Bay area of Ontario in 2020. It premiered at the 2021 Toronto International Film Festival. The Desperate Hour was theatrically released by Roadside Attractions and Vertical Entertainment on February 25, 2022.

Synopsis

On Friday, September 24, 2021, recently widowed mother, Amy Carr, decides to take a personal day off work. She waves goodbye to her young daughter, Emily, who boards a school bus, but discovers her teenaged son, Noah, still in bed complaining he is sick. Amy takes a jog through the woods, navigating through several routine calls while running. Shortly after meeting several police cars traveling hurriedly, Amy receives a bulletin on her cell phone reporting all area schools are in lockdown. Desperately trying to find out more information, Amy places several calls, the combination of which gradually allow her to piece together details. She learns there is an active shooter at the high school who has taken the life of a girl. Further, she concludes Noah is not home, but instead went to the high school after his truck is seen in the parking lot. A mechanic, whose shop is near the school, tells Amy the police are searching Noah's truck. He later adds that four other vehicles, besides Noah's, are also being searched. A police officer, via a 911 dispatcher, asks Amy questions about Noah which leads her to wonder if Noah is the school shooter. In a subsequent call, the police tell Amy that Noah is not the shooter, and the shooter is not a student.

Amy eventually makes her way to the highway where she meets a Lyft driver who takes her to the high school. Along the way, Amy calls the shooter's cell number which her boss surreptitiously retrieved. The shooter answers but hangs up after a brief exchange. Amy discovers the shooter is a former employee of the school. The police call Amy chiding her for calling the shooter and disrupting their negotiation efforts. Noah calls Amy, but the call is short and Noah is under obvious stress. The police call Amy back asking if she can, again, call the shooter, hoping she can distract him so the police can breach the room where the hostages are located. Amy arrives at the scene and during her brief call to the shooter, she hears gunfire and loses contact with both the shooter and Noah. Standing by the police barricades at the school's perimeter, Amy sees Noah emerge and the two are joyfully reunited. On the trip home, Amy's mother calls and tells Amy she is picking up Emily. Noah makes a social media post in which he denounces school shootings and encourages his audience to courageously fight against them.

Cast

Reception

Reviewer Shubhabrata Dutta of Digital Mafia Talkies described The Desperate Hour as "a film that is based almost completely on phone conversations".

References

External links
 

2021 films
2021 thriller films
American thriller films
Canadian thriller films
English-language Canadian films
Films about mobile phones
Films directed by Phillip Noyce
Roadside Attractions films
Vertical Entertainment films
Films produced by Zack Schiller
2020s English-language films
Films shot in North Bay, Ontario
2020s Canadian films
2020s American films